Luther Egbert Hall (August 30, 1869 – November 6, 1921) was the 35th governor of Louisiana from 1912 to 1916. Prior to that, he was a state senator from 1898 to 1900, a state district judge from 1900 to 1906, and state appellate judge from 1906 to 1911. Before his death, he was assistant attorney general from 1918 to 1921.

Career
He was elected to the Louisiana Supreme Court in 1912, but was then elected governor before taking his seat on the court. In becoming governor, he defeated James B. Aswell, the former president of Northwestern State University (then the Louisiana State Normal College) in Natchitoches in the Democratic primary.

Death
Hall died on November 6, 1921, of a heart attack while campaigning for a seat on the Louisiana Supreme Court. He is interred at Bastrop City Cemetery in Bastrop.

References

External links
 Cemetery Memorial by La-Cemeteries
 

Louisiana lawyers
Democratic Party governors of Louisiana
Democratic Party Louisiana state senators
Tulane University alumni
1869 births
1921 deaths
19th-century American lawyers